The 2020 Formula Regional Japanese Championship was a multi-event, Formula 3 open-wheel single seater motor racing championship held in Japan. The drivers were competing in Formula Regional cars that conform to the FIA Formula Regional regulations for the championship. This was the inaugural season of the championship, and was promoted by K2 Planet.

The season started on 1 August at Fuji Speedway and ran until 13 December.

Teams and drivers 
All teams and drivers competed using the Dome F111/3 Regional F3 car.

Race calendar 

The initial calendar was announced on 27 December 2019. After the COVID-19 pandemic forced the postponement of two races, a revised schedule was announced on 17 June 2020, with 14 races across 6 meetings, starting on 1 August and running until December.

Championship standings

Scoring system 
Points were awarded to the top ten drivers.

Drivers' championship

References

External links 

 

Formula Regional Japanese Championship
Japan F3
Formula Regional
Formula Regional Japanese Championship